Robin Coste Lewis is an American poet, artist, and scholar. She is known primarily for her debut poetry collection, Voyage of the Sable Venus and Other Poems, which won the National Book Award for Poetry in 2015––the first time a poetry debut by an African-American had ever won the prize in the National Book Foundation's history, and the first time any debut had won the award since 1974. Critics called the collection “A masterpiece…” “Surpassing imagination, maturity, and aesthetic dazzle…” “remarkable hopefulness…in the face of what would make most rage and/or collapse...” “formally polished, emotionally raw, and wholly exquisite." Voyage of the Sable Venus was also a finalist for the LA Times Book Prize, the Hurston-Wright Award, and the California Book Award. The Paris Review, The New Yorker, The New York Times, Buzz Feed, and Entropy Magazine all named Voyage one of the best poetry collections of the year. Flavorwire named the collection one of the 10 must-read books about art. And Literary Hub named Voyage one of the “Most Important Books of the Last Twenty Years.” In 2018, MoMA commissioned both Lewis and Kevin Young to write a series of poems to accompany Robert Rauschenberg’s drawings in the book "Thirty-Four Illustrations of Dante’s Inferno" (MoMA, 2018). Lewis is also the author of "Inhabitants and Visitors," a chapbook published by Clockshop and the Huntington Library and Museum. Her next book, To the Realization of Perfect Helplessness, was published by Knopf in 2022.

Lewis’s writing has appeared in various journals and anthologies, such as Time Magazine, The New Yorker, The New York Times, The Paris Review, Transition, and Best American Poetry. Lewis was also the poet laureate for the City of Los Angeles from 2017–2020. She is the recipient of many fellowships and awards, including the Joseph Brodsky Rome Prize from the American Academy in Rome, a Guggenheim Fellowship, a Ford Foundation "Art of Change" Fellowship, and a Cave Canem fellowship amongst others. In 2018, Lewis was named one of Los Angeles County's "Women of the Year" Award. Other fellowships and awards include those from the Cave Canem Foundation, the Los Angeles Institute of the Humanities, the Caldera Foundation, the Ragdale Foundation, the Headlands Center for the Arts, and the Summer Literary Seminars in Kenya. Lewis was also a finalist for the International War Poetry Prize and the National Rita Dove Prize.

In addition to writing, Lewis is also a text and image artist. Her work has appeared at the Huntington Museum, the Underground Museum, Hauser & Wirth, and Gallerie Marian Goodman (Paris), amongst others. Lewis also regularly collaborates or receives commissions from other artists, including Glenn Ligon, Lorna Simpson, and Julie Mehretu.

Biography
Lewis received her BA from Hampshire College in creative writing and comparative literature; a Masters of Theological Studies degree in Sanskrit and comparative religious literature from the Divinity School at Harvard University; an MFA in poetry at New York University; and a PhD from the University of Southern California"s Creative Writing and Literature Program, where she was a Provost’s Fellow in poetry and visual studies. Lewis’s current scholarly research focuses on the intersecting production histories of early African American poetry and photography, for which she also received the Anne Friedberg Memorial Grant from USC's Visual Studies Research Institute.

Lewis has taught on the faculty of Wheaton College, Hunter College, and Hampshire College. Currently, she teaches in NYU's low-residency MFA in Paris, and is a writer-in-residence at USC. She lives in Los Angeles.

Born in Compton, California, her family is from New Orleans.

Bibliography
Voyage of the Sable Venus: And Other Poems. New York: Alfred A. Knopf, 2015. 
To the Realization of Perfect Helplessness. New York: Alfred A. Knopf, 2022. ISBN  9781524732585

References

American women poets
Living people
Harvard Divinity School alumni
21st-century American poets
21st-century American women writers
African-American poets
New York University alumni
University of Southern California fellows
Wheaton College faculty
Hunter College faculty
New York University faculty
Hampshire College alumni
Poets Laureate of Los Angeles
American women academics
21st-century African-American women writers
21st-century African-American writers
1964 births